Gunda Pauline Johansen (born 2 May 1952) is a Norwegian politician for the Labour Party.

She served as a deputy representative to the Norwegian Parliament from Troms during the term 2005–2009.

On the local level Johansen is the mayor of Balsfjord municipality since 2003.

References

1952 births
Living people
Deputy members of the Storting
Labour Party (Norway) politicians
Mayors of places in Troms
Women mayors of places in Norway
20th-century Norwegian women politicians
20th-century Norwegian politicians
Women members of the Storting
People from Balsfjord